Emam Qaleh may refer to:
 Emam Qaleh, Mashhad
 Emam Qaleh, Torbat-e Jam